Cape Washington is a headland in North Greenland. Administratively it belongs to the Northeast Greenland National Park.

Geography
Benedict Fjord lies to the east of the cape with its mouth between Cape Washington and Cape Cannon. The Raven Glacier has its terminus on the western side, south of Cape Washington, in the area of the mouth of Hunt Fjord. 

Together with Cape Cannon and Cape Christian IV, Cape Washington is one of the northernmost headlands of mainland Greenland, east of Cape Morris Jesup.

See also
Peary Land

References

External links
 The Second Thule Expedition to Northern Greenland, 1916-1918

Headlands of Greenland
Peary Land